Quadirabad Cantonment is a cantonment located in Natore, Rajshahi division, Bangladesh. This cantonment is home of Engineers Centre and School

History
The cantonment was named after Lt Col Abdul Qadir who was killed in the Bangladesh Liberation war. He was buried in a mass grave in an unknown site. His son Nadeem Qadir discovered the body in a mass grave in Panchlaish Thana, Chittagong District in 2007 and he was reburied in the cantonment in September 2011.

Units
5th Engineering Corps
Engineer Centre and School of Military Engineering (ECSME)
Station Headquarters, Qadirabad Cantonment 
ECSME Training Battalion

Institutions
Qadirabad Cantonment Public School
Bangladesh Army University of Engineering & Technology
Qadirabad Cantonment Sapper College
Combined Military Hospital

References

Cantonments of Bangladesh